Becoming Jimi Hendrix: From Southern Crossroads to Psychedelic London, the Untold Story of a Musical Genius is a biography of American rock and roll musician Jimi Hendrix, written by Steven Roby and Brad Schreiber and published by Da Cabo Press in 2010.

The book is an account of Hendrix's life leading up to his international popularity. The authors chronicle Hendrix's life starting as a musically obsessed child, through his time in the Army, and years as a working musician, living in poverty and learning from artists like Little Richard and The Isley Brothers. It also details the kinds of lives he led while living in different areas – Nashville, Greenwich Village, and Harlem, for example—and how influence of those places and people he associated in each on his musical style. David Kirby of The New York Times highlights the book's finding that Hendrix's exposure to Bob Dylan was among his most defining moments, becoming successful the following year. For Adweek, the most salient insight into Hendrix's personality presented by the book was his great interest in science fiction literature.

References

Jimi Hendrix
Hendrix, Jimi
2010 non-fiction books